Reynier Covyn (1632, Antwerp – 1681, Dordrecht), was a Dutch Golden Age genre painter.

Biography
According to Houbraken he usually painted a table with all sorts of vegetables; cabbage, carrots, celery root, artichokes, and so forth, with a servant girl carrying an egg basket or copper bucket on her arm, or a young lady sewing or doing needlework. He was the brother of Israel Covyn.

According to the RKD he married on 26 May 1662 in Papendrecht, and lived in 1667 in Dordrecht in the Breestraat. He made a trip with his brother Israel Covyn to Antwerp in 1674. He was a follower (and possibly a pupil) of Nicolaes Maes and is known for kitchen scenes, fruit still lifes, and breakfast pieces.

References

Reynier Covyn on Artnet

1632 births
1681 deaths
Dutch Golden Age painters
Dutch male painters
Dutch genre painters
Dutch still life painters
Clergy from Antwerp